Phyxelida is a genus of araneomorph spiders in the family Phyxelididae, and was first described by Eugène Louis Simon in 1894.

Species
 it contains seventeen species, found in Africa, Israel, on Cyprus, and in Turkey:
Phyxelida abyssinica Griswold, 1990 – Ethiopia
Phyxelida anatolica Griswold, 1990 – Cyprus, Turkey, Israel
Phyxelida apwania Griswold, 1990 – Kenya, Tanzania
Phyxelida bifoveata (Strand, 1913) – East Africa
Phyxelida carcharata Griswold, 1990 – Kenya
Phyxelida crassibursa Griswold, 1990 – Kenya
Phyxelida eurygyna Griswold, 1990 – Malawi
Phyxelida irwini Griswold, 1990 – Kenya
Phyxelida jabalina Griswold, 1990 – Tanzania
Phyxelida kipia Griswold, 1990 – Tanzania
Phyxelida makapanensis Simon, 1894 (type) – South Africa
Phyxelida mirabilis (L. Koch, 1875) – Ethiopia
Phyxelida nebulosa (Tullgren, 1910) – Kenya, Tanzania
Phyxelida pingoana Griswold, 1990 – Kenya
Phyxelida sindanoa Griswold, 1990 – Kenya
Phyxelida tanganensis (Simon & Fage, 1922) – Tanzania
Phyxelida umlima Griswold, 1990 – Tanzania

See also
 List of Phyxelididae species

References

Araneomorphae genera
Phyxelididae
Spiders of Africa
Spiders of Asia